Shchyrets is an urban-type settlement in Lviv Raion of Lviv Oblast in Ukraine. It is located on the Shchyrka, in the drainage basin of the Dniester. Shchyrets hosts the administration of Shchyrets settlement hromada, one of the hromadas of Ukraine. Population: 

Until 18 July 2020, Shchyrets belonged to Pustomyty Raion. The raion was abolished in July 2020 as part of the administrative reform of Ukraine, which reduced the number of raions of Lviv Oblast to seven. The area of Pustomyty Raion was merged into Lviv Raion.

Second World War Polish Army commander Gen. Stanisław Maczek hailed from Shchyrets.

Economy

Transportation
There are two railway stations in the settlement, Shchyrets I and Shchyrets II. They are both on the railway connecting Lviv and Stryi.

Shchyrets is embedded into the dense road network south of Lviv. In particular, it has access to Highway M06 which connects Lviv and Uzhhorod.

References

Urban-type settlements in Lviv Raion